Cedar Hills is a city in north-central Utah County, Utah, United States. The population was 9,796 at the 2010 census, up from 3,094 in 2000. The city began growing rapidly during the 1990s and is located east of Alpine and Highland on the slopes of Mount Timpanogos.

Geography

Demographics

As of the census of 2000, there were 3,094 people, 695 households, and 658 families residing in the town. The population density was 1,573.3 inhabitants per square mile (606.4/km). There were 721 housing units at an average density of 366.6 per square mile (141.3/km). The racial makeup of the town was 97.09% White, 0.10% African American, 0.29% Native American, 0.52% Asian, 0.19% Pacific Islander, 0.52% from other races, and 1.29% from two or more races. Hispanic or Latino of any race were 1.94% of the population.

There were 695 households, out of which 76.8% had children under 18 living with them, 89.1% were married couples living together, 4.3% had a female householder with no husband present, and 5.3% were non-families. 4.9% of all households were made up of individuals, and 1.4% had someone living alone who was 65 years or older. The average household size was 4.44, and the average family size was 4.58.

Cedar Hills has many children, with 49.0% of the population under 18, 7.2% from 18 to 24, 30.4% from 25 to 44, 10.4% from 45 to 64, and 3.0% who were 65 years of age or older. The median age was 18 years. For every 100 females, there were 101.4 males. For every 100 females aged 18 and over, there were 96.6 males.

The median income for a household in the town was $62,688, and the median income for a family was $63,625. Males had a median income of $52,813 versus $32,708 for females. The per capita income was $16,319. About 3.8% of families and 4.5% of the population were below the poverty line, including 5.1% of those under age 18 and 5.7% of those aged 65 or over.

Education
Cedar Hills Public schools are part of the Alpine School District and include access to two senior high schools and two junior high schools in neighboring Highland and American Fork, and two elementary schools in the city, Cedar Ridge and Deerfield.  The current Superintendent is Samuel Y. Jarman.

Businesses
The city's current business license ordinance indicates the requirements and any restrictions in operating a home occupation business, as well as other types of businesses.

Notable people
 Ben Cahoon, former receiver for the Montreal Alouettes and current wide receivers coach for the Brigham Young University Cougars
 Chad Lewis, former NFL tight end for the Philadelphia Eagles
 Zackery Farnsworth, current MLS centerback for Real Salt Lake

City ordinances
As the bedroom community grew and the prospect of businesses locating in Cedar Hills loomed, there was a dispute as to whether stores should be allowed to open on Sunday and whether alcohol should be allowed to be sold. This was due to a large majority of the city's residents being members of the Church of Jesus Christ of Latter-day Saints, but it was resolved in 2005 when a referendum vote on two initiatives (one prohibiting businesses from being open on Sunday and the other prohibiting selling alcohol) were defeated. The anchor business for the commercial center, Walmart, opened in 2009 and remains open on Sundays and sells beer.

See also

 List of cities and towns in Utah

References

External links

 

Cities in Utah
Cities in Utah County, Utah
Populated places established in 1974
Provo–Orem metropolitan area